So Far So Good is the fourth studio album by American DJ and production duo the Chainsmokers. It was released on May 13, 2022, via Disruptor and Columbia Records. it is their first album in 3 years since  World War Joy (2019)  Unlike the duo's previous projects, this album does not feature any artists, but includes production credits from Ian Kirkpatrick and Ethan Snoreck, and writing credits from Chris Martin, Emily Warren, Faheem Najm and Akon. The album debuted at No. 1 on the US Billboard Top Dance/Electronic albums chart.

This album was preceded by singles, "High" and "iPad" as well as the promotional single "Riptide". The former peaked at number 57 on the Billboard Hot 100, while the latter two debuted at number six and number nine on the Billboard Hot Dance/Electronic Songs chart respectively.

On October 21, 2022, a remixed version of the album titled So Far So Good (lofi remixes) was released with lo-fi renditions of all of the standard edition tracks.

Background 
The creation process for So Far So Good began after the Chainsmokers' 2019 tour, with the duo recording vlogs of them making the album and the process. The project was made under vastly different circumstances than much of their past work. Whereas the duo often built albums while on the road, releasing one track at a time between tour stops, at the end of 2019 they announced they were going on an extended hiatus to give themselves time to focus on just recording music. The production process for So Far So Good began on the North Shore of Oahu, Hawaii a few weeks after the World War Joy tour ended. Taggart and Pall rented a house with the electronic producer Whethan, Ian Kirkpatrick and Emily Warren to work on the album. Work continued during writing retreats in Joshua Tree, California, New York and London, with the duo assembling, then discarding, lyrics and production elements hundreds of times. "To me, these songs sound like they took two years to make," said their manager Alpert. They also did an interview with Zane Lowe on Apple Music, where they talked about mental health struggles and how the album came together.

On May 17, 2022, the Chainsmokers distributed 5,000 NFTs that give rights to streaming royalties from So Far So Good.

On June 8, 2022, The Chainsmokers via Twitter announced a new song, "The Fall", a collaboration with Ship Wrek. The song was added to the album on June 10, as So Far So Good (+ The Fall). On July 1, 2022, the duo released "Why Can't You Wait", a collaboration with Bob Moses. The song, along with "The Fall", was added to a reissue of the album subtitled (+ Why Can't You Wait). On July 22, 2022, the duo released "Time Bomb". The song, along with both "The Fall" and "Why Can't You Wait", was added to a reissue of the album subtitled (+ Time Bomb).

Critical reception

Neil Z. Yeung from AllMusic stated that "While the overall energy is familiar, fun, and groove-forward enough to provide proper escapism, the vulnerable lyrics and sad boy gloom could inspire unexpected tears on the dancefloor. The Chainsmokers seem to be demonstrating more and more maturity and emotional depth with each successive album, especially on this aptly titled set." Daniel Bromfield of Pitchfork wrote that the Chainsmokers retained the "essential elements of their EDM-pop style and cut out everything else, including guest features", resulting in "easily their most enjoyable front-to-back listen".

Commercial performance 
So Far So Good debuted at No. 1 on the US Billboard Top Dance/Electronic Albums chart and at No. 106 on the Billboard 200 with 10,000 album-equivalent units (including 9,000 pure album sales) on the chart dated May 28, 2022.

Track listing 

Notes
 "Riptide" and "The Fall" feature background vocals by Emily Warren
 "In Too Deep" and "Time Bomb" feature uncredited vocals by Chloe George

Personnel
 Adam Alpert – executive production
 Alex Pall – production (all), songwriting (all)
 Andrew Taggart – production (all), songwriting (all), vocals (all)
 Ian Kirkpatrick – production (1, 3, 4, 5, 6, 7, 8, 9, 12, 13), songwriting (1, 4, 5, 6, 7, 8, 9, 12, 13)
 Whethan – production (1, 2, 4, 6, 9, 10), songwriting (1, 2, 4, 6, 9, 10)
 Emily Warren – songwriting (1, 4, 5, 6, 9, 12, 13), background vocals (1)
 Chris Martin – songwriting (1)
 Faheem Najm – songwriting (7)
 Akon – songwriting (7)

Charts

References 

2022 albums
The Chainsmokers albums